Ignatius Basile Moses I Daoud (or Moussa Daoud) (18 September 1930 – 7 April 2012) was Patriarch of Antioch for the Syrian Catholic Church, a Cardinal Bishop (because he was an Eastern Patriarch elevated to Cardinal), and Prefect of the Congregation for the Oriental Churches in the Catholic Church.

Biography 
Born in Meskaneh, a village near Homs, Syria, he was ordained a priest on 17 October 1954. He earned a degree in Canon law at the Pontifical Lateran University in Rome. On 18 September 1977 he was consecrated Bishop of Cairo by Patriarch Ignatius Antony II Hayyek. In 1994 he was appointed Archbishop of Homs of the Catholic Syrians.

Then-Archbishop Moses Daoud was elected Patriarch of Antioch for the Syrian Catholic Church on 13 October 1998. He was confirmed as Patriarch of Antioch by Pope John Paul II on 20 October 1998, and was enthroned as Patriarch of Antioch on 25 October 1998. By custom, he added the name Ignatius to his own name, honoring Saint Ignatius of Antioch. He retired from the Patriarchal See on 8 January 2001, shortly after being named Prefect of the Congregation for the Oriental Churches, which deals with Vatican relations with the Eastern-Rite Churches in communion with Rome, by Pope John Paul II, on 25 November 2000.

Moses Daoud was proclaimed cardinal-bishop by Pope John Paul in the consistory of 21 February 2001. He was one of the cardinal electors who participated in the 2005 papal conclave that elected Pope Benedict XVI. On 9 June 2007, Patriarch Emeritus Ignatius Moses I resigned his post as Prefect of the Congregation for the Oriental Churches.

Until his 80th birthday, he was a member of the following dicasteries of the Roman Curia:
 Congregation for the Doctrine of the Faith
 Congregation for the Causes of the Saints
 Pontifical Council for Promoting Christian Unity
 Pontifical Council for the Interpretation of Legislative Texts
 Special Council for Lebanon of the General Secretariat of the Synod of Bishops

He died on 7 April 2012 in Rome. A funeral Mass in the Roman Rite took place on 10 April 2012, at Saint Peter's Basilica in Vatican City, with the Dean of the Sacred College of Cardinals, former Cardinal Secretary of State Angelo Sodano, as principal celebrant. Cardinal Daoud's body was then flown to Beirut and with Syriac rites buried with other Patriarchs of Antioch in Sharfeh, Harissa, Lebanon on 16 April 2012. In his homily, Cardinal Sodano said he had visited the ailing Patriarch a few days before he died of complications from a cerebrovascular accident (CVA, or stroke). He said Cardinal Daoud told him he was "offering to the Lord his suffering for the good of the holy Church and above all for the unity of all Christians". In a message to the incumbent Syriac Patriarch of Antioch, Ignatius Joseph III Younan, Pope Benedict XVI called the Cardinal Patriarch "a faithful Pastor who devoted himself with faith and generosity to the service of the people of God". He went on to say that, "these days, when we celebrate the resurrection of the Lord", he was offering special prayers "for the peoples of the region who are living through difficult times".

Distinctions 
 Grand Master of the Order of Saint Ignatius of Antioch

References

External links
 Biography at catholic-pages.com
 Biography at Holy Roman Cardinals page

Syrian cardinals
1930 births
2012 deaths
Pontifical Lateran University alumni
Daoud
Syrian archbishops
Members of the Congregation for the Oriental Churches
Cardinals created by Pope John Paul II
Syriac Catholic bishops
20th-century Eastern Catholic bishops
21st-century Eastern Catholic bishops
Burials in Lebanon
Recipients of the Order of Saint Ignatius of Antioch
Eastern Catholic bishops in Africa
Eastern Catholic bishops in Syria